Tribunales is a station on Line D of the Buenos Aires Underground.

Overview
The station was opened on 3 June 1937 as the western terminus of the inaugural section of Line D, from Catedral to Tribunales. It was named in honor of Palace of Justice, the most important tribunal of the city. On 23 February 1940 the line was extended to Palermo.

In 1997 the station was declared a national historic monument

References

External links

Buenos Aires Underground stations
1937 establishments in Argentina